Dylan Marshall Brady (born November 27, 1993) is an American music producer and singer-songwriter best known for being one half of experimental electronic music duo 100 Gecs, alongside Laura Les. He also owns and operates the record label, Dog Show Records.

Early life
Dylan Marshall Brady grew up in suburban St. Louis, Missouri and took piano lessons in high school, where he first became interested in composing music. While attending college for audio engineering, he began putting music out on SoundCloud, as an electronic hip hop producer. He is currently based in Los Angeles, California, where he collaborates with musical partner Laura Les, who moved from Chicago to LA in 2022 to more easily work together following years of remote collaboration.

Career
Brady began his career releasing several demo albums on SoundCloud in 2013 and 2014. He self-released his debut studio album All I Ever Wanted in May 2015. In 2016 he released the EP Choker and released a self-titled EP as part of 100 gecs. In 2017 Brady released two EPs, Sinses and Dog Show. In October 2018, Brady released the EP Peace & Love, his first release on the Mad Decent label. His collaborative studio album with producer Josh Pan, This Car Needs Some Wheels, was released in March 2019.

Brady is also the leader of the St. Louis-based band Cake Pop with Cali Cartier, Ravenna Golden, Lewis Grant, Pritty, Robel Ketema, Kevin Bedford, and Adam Newcomer. They released their debut self-titled EP on SoundCloud in 2015. On March 30, 2021, the band announced their debut studio album, Cake Pop 2, in addition to releasing its lead single, "Black Rum". The second single, "Satin Bedsheets", was released on April 20, 2021, followed by the release of Cake Pop 2 on April 30, 2021.

Discography

Studio albums

Demo albums

Extended plays

Singles

As lead artist

As featured artist

Soundcloud releases

Guest performances

Production and songwriting credits
Credits taken from Tidal.

Remixes

As part of 100 Gecs

1000 Gecs (2019)
1000 Gecs and the Tree of Clues (2020)
10,000 Gecs (2023)

As part of Cake Pop
Studio albums
 Cake Pop 2 (2021)
Extended plays
 CAKE POP (2015)
Singles
"Sticky Fingers" (2016)
"Black Rum" (2021)
"Satin Bedsheets" (2021)

References

American hip hop record producers
American male singer-songwriters
Record producers from Missouri
Musicians from St. Louis
Owsla artists
1993 births
Living people
Singer-songwriters from Missouri
American electronic musicians
American experimental musicians
Hyperpop musicians